A trick candle is a novelty candle capable of relighting itself. By igniting magnesium inserted into the wick of the candle, the paraffin vapor given off when a candle is blown out can be set alight, allowing the candle to reignite itself.

Trick candles were banned in Canada in 1977. They present a fire risk in that consumers may throw them into the trash believing them to have been extinguished, only for the candles to relight. A spokesperson for the National Candle Association recommends immersing the candles in water for a while before discarding them.

See also
 List of practical joke topics

References

Candles
Practical joke devices